Schoutedenia lutea, is an aphid in the superfamily Aphidoidea in the order Hemiptera. It is a true bug and sucks sap from plants.

References 

 http://animaldiversity.org/accounts/Schoutedenia_lutea/classification/
 http://www.nbair.res.in/Aphids/Schoutedenia-lutea.php
 
 https://www.gbif.org/species/2077376/
 http://cabdirect.org/abstracts/20103236746.html;jsessionid=D1482BA740CCBE06233DE6C22BBB356A

Greenideinae
Agricultural pest insects